Doctor Glas (Swedish: Doktor Glas) is a 1942 Swedish drama film directed by Rune Carlsten and starring Georg Rydeberg, Irma Christenson and Hilda Borgström. It is based on the 1905 novel of the same name by Hjalmar Söderberg. The film's sets were designed by the art director Bertil Duroj. It was shot at the Centrumateljéerna Studios in Stockholm and on location around the city.

Plot 
Dr. Glas, an austere and well-respected physician, is in love with Helga Gregorius, one of his patients. When she confides in him that her husband’s sexual attentions disgust her but that, despite this, he will not leave her alone, the doctor begins to plot to rid her of him.

Cast 

 Georg Rydeberg as Dr. Glas
 Irma Christenson as Helga Gregorius
 Rune Carlsten as Rev. Gregorius
 Hilda Borgström as Kristin
 Gösta Cederlund as Markel
 Gabriel Alw as Martin Birck
 Sven Bergvall as Lowenius 
 Gösta Grip as Klas Recke
 Guje Lagerwall as Eva Mertens 
 Sven d'Ailly as Holm
 Artur Cederborgh as the head waiter 
 Theodor Olsson as Helga's father 
 Helge Mauritz as a policeman 
 Eric Laurent as a policeman 
 Egil Holmsen as the student 
 Anna-Lisa Fröberg as the waitress 
 Karin Lannby as Agnes Holm 
 Lillebil Kjellén as Lowenius' daughter

Reception 
The reviews at the time of the film's release were positive. "The camera work, depicting enchanting views over the city of Stockholm was especially noted and praised."

Nordic National Cinemas calls it "one of the most successful productions [of the wartime]" and notes that Georg Rydeberg "splendidly portrays the itinerant loner Glas".

References

External links

1942 films
Swedish black-and-white films
Swedish drama films
1942 drama films
Films directed by Rune Carlsten
Films based on Swedish novels
1940s Swedish-language films
Films set in Stockholm
Films shot in Stockholm